Tu Mo Love Story is an Indian Odia-language drama feature film directed by Tapas Sargharia produced by Deepak Kumar Mishra for Tarang Cine Productions, and DK Movies. Starring Swaraj Barik and 
Bhoomika Dash, and with a screenplay by Tapas Sargharia, it was released on 7 April 2017.

Cast
 Swaraj Barik
 Bhoomika Dash
 Mihir Das
 Priyanka Mahapatra
 Manoj Mishra
 Choudhury Bikash Das
 Debasish Patra
 Tribhuban Panda
 Bhakti Ranjan Das
 Sabita Dyna Behera

Music
All songs are composed by Prem Anand.

 Music Director- Prem Anand
 Vocals - Asutosh Mohanty, Diptirekha Padhi, Humane Sagar, Ananya Nanda, Biswajit Mohapatra

Track listing

References 

2017 films
2010s Odia-language films